This was a list of ministers from Biplab Kumar Deb cabinet starting from 11 March 2018 to 14 May 2022. Biplab Kumar Deb is the leader of BJP who was sworn in the Chief Ministers of Tripura on 11 March 2018. It's ended on 14 May 2022 with the abolishment of his CM post.

The ministry has 8 ministers including the Chief Minister. The following is the list of ministers of his ministry.

In the current government, 9 incumbents including the Chief Minister belongs to the BJP while 2 incumbents belongs to the IPFT.

Council of Ministers 

 As in May 2022

Former Ministers

See also 

 Government of Tripura
 Tripura Legislative Assembly

References

Bharatiya Janata Party state ministries
Indigenous People's Front of Tripura
2018 in Indian politics
Tripura ministries
2018 establishments in Tripura
Cabinets established in 2018